The Battle of Nipe Bay on July 21, 1898 was an engagement of the Spanish–American War. The battle was fought in Nipe Bay, Cuba, by four United States Navy warships against the Spanish sloop-of-war Jorge Juan and three gunboats which were supported by forts guarding the harbor.

Battle

Nipe Bay had been designated as a rendezvous point for American naval forces delegated to attack Puerto Rico. Upon finding the harbor still occupied by Spanish forces, the American squadron, consisting of the gunboats USS Annapolis and USS Topeka, the armed tug USS Leyden and the armed yacht , maneuvered through a minefield to engage the Spanish forces. Jorge Juan opened fire on Wasp and Leyden, but they quickly sank her with help from Annapolis. While the other three ships were engaging Jorge Juan, Topeka silenced the harbor forts and fired on other Spanish works in the harbor.

Aftermath
Seeing the hopelessness of the situation, the Spanish sailed the small gunboat Baracoa upriver and scuttled her to prevent her capture by the superior American force. Just as the fighting came to an end, U.S. Navy personnel boarded Jorge Juans sinking hulk, stripping several items from it as trophies. One such trophy was the Jorge Juans battle-flag, which was taken by one of the sailors from Annapolis and now resides in the United States Navy Trophy Flag Collection. The Americans suffered few, if any, casualties and a few days after the battle the small squadron received orders to depart. The United STates later decided that the bay was not necessary for operations U.S. operations in Puerto Rico, but the battle did cause significant damage to the Spanish Navy and denied the Spanish the use of the port for the remainder of the war.

Sources
 New York Times, July 24, 1898
 
 The Downfall of Spain: Naval History of the Spanish–American War at Google Books

Naval battles of the Spanish–American War
Battles involving Cuba
Battle of Nipe Bay
Battle of Nipe Bay
Conflicts in 1898
Battle of Nipe Bay